Maria Amelia Herrera Silva  is a Chilean politician. She served as deputy for the 12th district and previously was mayor of Quilpué from 1996 to 2004.

Family
In 2015, her husband Arturo Longton died. They had sons Arturo and Andrés Longton; and a daughter Amelia Longton.

Electoral Resume

Municipal Elections 1992 
Quilpué's mayoralty

Municipal Elections 1996 
Quilpué's mayoralty

Municipal Elections 2000 
Quilpué's mayoralty

References

1950 births
Living people
20th-century Chilean women politicians
20th-century Chilean politicians
21st-century Chilean women politicians
21st-century Chilean politicians
Members of the Chamber of Deputies of Chile
National Renewal (Chile) politicians
Women mayors of places in Chile
Women members of the Chamber of Deputies of Chile